is a Japanese anime television series consisting of 26 episodes. It was created by Shotaro Ishinomori and directed by Rintaro. The anime series produced by Studio Zero was broadcast on TBS between 5 April and 27 September 1974. A manga version by Ishinomori was serialized in Kodansha's  Weekly Shōjo Friend magazine from April 20, 1974 (Issue 14) to November 5, 1974 (Issue 27).

References

External links
 
 

1974 anime television series debuts
Comedy anime and manga
Science fiction anime and manga
TBS Television (Japan) original programming
Extraterrestrials in anime and manga
1974 Japanese television series endings